The year 676 BC was a year of the pre-Julian Roman calendar. In the Roman Empire, it was known as year 78 Ab urbe condita . The denomination 676 BC for this year has been used since the early medieval period, when the Anno Domini calendar era became the prevalent method in Europe for naming years.

Events

By place

Greece 
Kallisthenes of Laconia wins the stadion race at the 26th Olympic Games.

Middle East 
 The Elamite king Urtaku comes to power; during his reign relations between Elam and Babylonia worsen.

China 
Zhou hui wang becomes King of the Zhou Dynasty of China.

Births

Deaths

References 

 
670s BC